Cham Nezami (also Romanized as Cham Nez̧āmī) is a village in Ab Baran Rural District, Joulaki District, Aghajari County, Khuzestan Province, Iran. At the 2011 census, its population was 49, in 15 families.

References 

Populated places in Aghajari County